The APRA Music Awards of 2021 are the 39th annual series, known as APRA Awards. The awards are given in a series of categories in three divisions and in separate ceremonies throughout the year: the APRA Music Awards, Art Music Awards and Screen Music Awards. The APRA Music Awards are provided by APRA AMCOS; nominations were revealed on 30 March 2021, and the ceremony followed on 28 April 2021. The Art Music Awards are jointly presented by APRA AMCOS and the Australian Music Centre (AMC). The finalists were announced in July with the winners revealed on 9 September. The Screen Music Awards are jointly provided by APRA and the Australian Guild of Screen Composers (AGSC) with the ceremony usually held in November, however, it was postponed to 22 February 2022.

CEO of APRA AMCOS Dean Ormston announced the 2021 awards, "As Australia slowly begins recovering from the coronavirus pandemic, our industry is still largely on pause. After such a difficult year, our sincere hope is that we can stage a traditional live ceremony for the 2021 APRA Music Awards. A physical event would announce that we're in a new era, one where we can celebrate the Australian songwriters that have excelled despite one of the most challenging years in memory. We hope to see you there in the flesh."

APRA Music Awards

Ted Albert Award for Outstanding Services to Australian Music

 Helen Reddy

 Joy McKean

APRA Song of the Year

Breakthrough Songwriter of the Year

 Note: Determined by the APRA Board of Writer and Publisher Directors

Songwriter of the Year

 Note: Determined by the APRA Board of Writer and Publisher Directors

Most Performed Alternative Work

Most Performed Australian Work

Most Performed Australian Work Overseas

Most Performed Blues & Roots Work

Most Performed Country Work

Most Performed Dance Work

Most Performed Hip Hop / Rap Work

Most Performed International Work

Most Performed Pop Work

Most Performed R&B / Soul Work

Most Performed Rock Work

Art Music Awards

Work of the Year: Chamber Music

Work of the Year: Choral

Work of the Year: Dramatic

Work of the Year: Electroacustic/Sound Art

Work of the Year: Jazz

Work of the Year: Large Ensemble

Performance of the Year: Jazz / Improvised Music

Performance of the Year: Notated Composition

Award for Excellence in Music Education

Award for Excellence in Experimental Music

Richard Gill Award for Distinguished Services to Australian Music

Luminary Award: Individual (National)

Luminary Award: Organisation (National)

Luminary Award: State & Territory Awards

Screen Music Awards

Feature Film Score of the Year

Best Music for an Advertisement

Best Music for Children's Programming

Best Music for a Documentary

Best Music for a Mini-Series or Telemovie

Best Music for a Short Film

Best Music for a Television Series or Serial

Best Original Song Composed for the Screen

Best Soundtrack Album

Best Television Theme

Most Performed Screen Composer – Australia

Most Performed Screen Composer – Overseas

References

2021 in Australian music
2021 music awards
APRA Awards